Jason Martin Wirth is an American philosopher and professor of philosophy at Seattle University. He was the Theiline Pigott McCone Chair in Humanities from 2014 to 2016. He won The Torch Bearer Award in 2018. Wirth is known for his research on environmental philosophy.

Books
 Mountains, Rivers, and the Great Earth: Reading Gary Snyder and Dōgen in an Age of Ecological Crisis, SUNY 2017
 Commiserating with Devastated Things, Fordham 2015
 Schelling’s Practice of the Wild, SUNY 2015
 The Conspiracy of Life: Meditations on Schelling and His Time, SUNY 2003
 Nietzsche and Other Buddhas, Indiana, spring 2019

References

External links
 Jason Wirth at Seattle University

21st-century American philosophers
Continental philosophers
Kant scholars
Philosophy academics
Heidegger scholars
Schelling scholars
Living people
1963 births
Philosophy journal editors
Philosophers of art
Environmental philosophers
Nietzsche scholars